The 2016–17 Charlotte 49ers men's basketball team represented the University of North Carolina at Charlotte during the 2016–17 NCAA Division I men's basketball season. The 49ers, led by second-year head coach Mark Price, played their home games at the Dale F. Halton Arena and were members Conference USA. They finished the season 13–17, 7–11 in C-USA play to finish in 10th place. They lost to UAB in the first round of the C-USA tournament.

Previous season
The 49ers finished the 2015–16 season 14–19, 9–9 in C-USA play to finish in seventh place. They defeated Rice in the second round of the C-USA tournament to advance to the quarterfinals where they lost to Middle Tennessee.

Preseason 
The 49ers were pick to finish eighth in the Conference USA preseason poll.

Departures

Incoming transfers

Class of 2016 recruits

Roster

Schedule and results

|-
!colspan=12 style=| Non-conference regular season

|-
!colspan=12 style=| Conference USA regular season

|-
!colspan=12 style=| Conference USA tournament

References

Charlotte
Charlotte 49ers men's basketball seasons